Brixham A.F.C. is an English football club based in Brixham, Devon. The club's nickname is The Blues. The club is a FA Charter Standard Club affiliated to the Devon County Football Association.

History
The club was formed in June 2012, when Brixham United and Brixham Villa merged in the South Devon League. Brixham Villa had been a club since 1953 and had previously won the league in the 2006–07 season, while Brixham United had competed in the Western Football League and FA Vase during the late 1970s.

After finishing runners up in the South Devon League the club joined the South West Peninsula League Division One East in 2014 and spent five seasons there, finishing third in 2018–19. At the end of that season the league was restructured, and Brixham successfully applied for promotion to the Premier Division East, at Step 6 of the National League System.

The club installed floodlights in order to comply with the conditions imposed upon them to enable their promotion to Step 6. They played their first match under floodlit conditions on 10 September 2019, a 2–1 win over Bovey Tracey.

Ground

The club play their home games at Wall Park. The ground was the home of Brixham United before becoming part of AFC Brixham.

References

External links

South Devon Football League
Association football clubs established in 2012
2012 establishments in England
Football clubs in England
Football clubs in Devon
South West Peninsula League
Brixham